Agliano may refer to:

Agliano, Campello sul Clitunno, a comune in the Province of Perugia, Umbria, Italy
Agliano Terme, a comune in the Province of Asti, Piedmont, Italy
Aglianico, or Agliano, an Italian black grape
Aleatico, or Agliano, an Italian red grape